Mayachny is a rural locality (a selo) in Kumertau, Bashkortostan, Russia. The population was 3,075 as of 2010. There are 35 streets.

Geography 
Mayachny is located 15 km southwest of Kumertau. Shabagish is the nearest rural locality.

References 

Rural localities in Kumertau